The Śuddhāvāsa worlds, or "Pure Abodes", are distinct from the other worlds of the  in that they do not house beings who have been born there through ordinary merit or meditative attainments, but only those Anāgāmins ("Non-returners") who are already on the path to Arhat-hood and who will attain enlightenment directly from the Śuddhāvāsa worlds without being reborn in a lower plane.  Every Śuddhāvāsa deva is therefore a protector of Buddhism. (Brahma Sahampati, who appealed to the newly enlightened Buddha to teach, was an Anagami from a previous Buddha). Because a Śuddhāvāsa deva will never be reborn outside the Śuddhāvāsa worlds, no Bodhisattva is ever born in these worlds, as a Bodhisattva must ultimately be reborn as a human being.

Since these devas rise from lower planes only due to the teaching of a Buddha, they can remain empty for very long periods if no Buddha arises.  However, unlike the lower worlds, the Śuddhāvāsa worlds are never destroyed by natural catastrophe. The Śuddhāvāsa devas predict the coming of a Buddha and, taking the guise of Brahmins, reveal to human beings the signs by which a Buddha can be recognized. They also ensure that a Bodhisattva in his last life will see the four signs that will lead to his renunciation.

Five Pure Abodes
The Princeton Dictionary of Buddhism states that "The heavens of the realm of subtle materiality consist of sixteen (according to the Sarvāstivāda school), seventeen (the Sautrantika school), or eighteen levels (the Theravada/Sthavirankāya school) of devas ... The last five heavens are collectively designated as the five pure abodes, and the divinities residing there are called the Śuddhāvāsakāyika devas."

The five  worlds are:
The highest of all the Rūpadhātu worlds, it is often used to refer to the highest extreme of the universe. The current Śakra will eventually be born there. Maheśvara, the ruler of the three realms of samsara, is said to dwell here. The height of this world is 167,772,160 yojanas above the Earth (approximately the distance of Saturn from Earth).
  or  – The "clear-seeing" devas live in a world similar to and friendly with the  world. The height of this world is 83,886,080 yojanas above the Earth (approximately the distance of Jupiter from Earth).
  or  – The world of the "beautiful" devas are said to be the place of rebirth for five kinds of anāgāmins. The height of this world is 41,943,040 yojanas above the Earth.
  or  – The world of the "untroubled" devas, whose company those of lower realms wish for. The height of this world is 20,971,520 yojanas above the Earth (approximately the distance of Sun from Earth).
  or Aviha – The world of the "not falling" devas, perhaps the most common destination for reborn Anāgāmins. Many achieve arhatship directly in this world, but some pass away and are reborn in sequentially higher worlds of the Pure Abodes until they are at last reborn in the  world. These are called in Pāli , "those whose stream goes upward". The height of this world is 10,485,760 yojanas above the Earth (approximately the distance of Mars from Earth).

References

Buddhist philosophical concepts
Buddhist cosmology